The Meissner effect (or Meissner–Ochsenfeld effect) is the expulsion of a magnetic field from a superconductor during its transition to the superconducting state when it is cooled below the critical temperature. This expulsion will repel a nearby magnet.

The German physicists Walther Meissner and Robert Ochsenfeld discovered this phenomenon in 1933 by measuring the magnetic field distribution outside superconducting tin and lead samples. The samples, in the presence of an applied magnetic field, were cooled below their superconducting transition temperature, whereupon the samples cancelled nearly all interior magnetic fields. They detected this effect only indirectly because the magnetic flux is conserved by a superconductor: when the interior field decreases, the exterior field increases. The experiment demonstrated for the first time that superconductors were more than just perfect conductors and provided a uniquely defining property of the superconductor state. The ability for the expulsion effect is determined by the nature of equilibrium formed by the neutralization within the unit cell of a superconductor.

A superconductor with little or no magnetic field within it is said to be in the Meissner state. The Meissner state breaks down when the applied magnetic field is too strong. Superconductors can be divided into two classes according to how this breakdown occurs. 

In type-I superconductors, superconductivity is abruptly destroyed when the strength of the applied field rises above a critical value Hc. Depending on the geometry of the sample, one may obtain an intermediate state consisting of a baroque pattern of regions of normal material carrying a magnetic field mixed with regions of superconducting material containing no field. 

In type-II superconductors, raising the applied field past a critical value Hc1 leads to a mixed state (also known as the vortex state) in which an increasing amount of magnetic flux penetrates the material, but there remains no resistance to the electric current as long as the current is not too large. At a second critical field strength Hc2, superconductivity is destroyed. The mixed state is caused by vortices in the electronic superfluid, sometimes called fluxons because the flux carried by these vortices is quantized. Most pure elemental superconductors, except niobium and carbon nanotubes, are type I, while almost all impure and compound superconductors are type II.

Explanation

The Meissner effect was given a phenomenological explanation by the brothers Fritz and Heinz London, who showed that the electromagnetic free energy in a superconductor is minimized provided

where H is the magnetic field and λ is the London penetration depth.

This equation, known as the London equation, predicts that the magnetic field in a superconductor decays exponentially from whatever value it possesses at the surface. This exclusion of magnetic field is a manifestation of the superdiamagnetism emerged during the phase transition from conductor to superconductor, for example by reducing the temperature below critical temperature.

In a weak applied field (less than the critical field that breaks down the superconducting phase), a superconductor expels nearly all magnetic flux by setting up electric currents near its surface, as the magnetic field H induces magnetization M within the London penetration depth from the surface. These surface currents shield the internal bulk of the superconductor from the external applied field. As the field expulsion, or cancellation, does not change with time, the currents producing this effect (called persistent currents or screening currents) do not decay with time.

Near the surface, within the London penetration depth, the magnetic field is not completely canceled. Each superconducting material has its own characteristic penetration depth.

Any perfect conductor will prevent any change to magnetic flux passing through its surface due to ordinary electromagnetic induction at zero resistance. However, the Meissner effect is distinct from this: when an ordinary conductor is cooled so that it makes the transition to a superconducting state in the presence of a constant applied magnetic field, the magnetic flux is expelled during the transition. This effect cannot be explained by infinite conductivity, but only by the London equation. The placement and subsequent levitation of a magnet above an already superconducting material do not demonstrate the Meissner effect, while an initially stationary magnet later being repelled by a superconductor as it is cooled below its critical temperature does.

The persisting currents that exist in the superconductor to expel the magnetic field is commonly misconceived as a result of Lenz's Law or Faraday's Law. A reason this is not the case is that no change in flux was made to induce the current. Another explanation is that since the superconductor experiences zero resistance, there cannot be an induced emf in the superconductor. The persisting current therefore is not a result of Faraday's Law.

Perfect diamagnetism
Superconductors in the Meissner state exhibit perfect diamagnetism, or superdiamagnetism, meaning that the total magnetic field is very close to zero deep inside them (many penetration depths from the surface). This means that their volume magnetic susceptibility is  = −1. Diamagnetics are defined by the generation of a spontaneous magnetization of a material which directly opposes the direction of an applied field. However, the fundamental origins of diamagnetism in superconductors and normal materials are very different. In normal materials diamagnetism arises as a direct result of the orbital spin of electrons about the nuclei of an atom induced electromagnetically by the application of an applied field. In superconductors the illusion of perfect diamagnetism arises from persistent screening currents which flow to oppose the applied field (the Meissner effect); not solely the orbital spin.

Consequences
The discovery of the Meissner effect led to the phenomenological theory of superconductivity by Fritz and Heinz London in 1935. This theory explained resistanceless transport and the Meissner effect, and allowed the first theoretical predictions for superconductivity to be made. However, this theory only explained experimental observations—it did not allow the microscopic origins of the superconducting properties to be identified. This was done successfully by the BCS theory in 1957, from which the penetration depth and the Meissner effect result. However, some physicists argue that BCS theory does not explain the Meissner effect.

Paradigm for the Higgs mechanism
The Meissner superconductivity effect serves as an important paradigm for the generation mechanism of a mass M (i.e. a reciprocal range,  where h is the Planck constant and c is the speed of light) for a gauge field. In fact, this analogy is an abelian example for the Higgs mechanism, which generates the masses of the electroweak  and  gauge particles in high-energy physics. The length  is identical with the London penetration depth in the theory of superconductivity.

See also

Flux pinning
Silsbee effect
Superfluid
Type-I superconductor
Type-II superconductor

References

Further reading

 By the man who explained the Meissner effect. pp. 34–37 gives a technical discussion of the Meissner effect for a superconducting sphere.
 pp. 486–489 gives a simple mathematical discussion of the surface currents responsible for the Meissner effect, in the case of a long magnet levitated above a superconducting plane.
 A good technical reference.

External links

Maglev Trains Audio slideshow from the National High Magnetic Field Laboratory discusses magnetic levitation, the Meissner Effect, magnetic flux trapping and superconductivity.
Meissner Effect (Science from scratch) Short video from Imperial College London about the Meissner effect and levitating trains of the future.
Introduction to superconductivity Video about Type 1 Superconductors: R = 0/Transition temperatures/B is a state variable/Meissner effect/Energy gap (Giaever)/BCS model.
Meissner Effect (Hyperphysics)
Historical Background of the Meissner Effect

Magnetic levitation
Quantum magnetism
Superconductivity